The 2017 SEC women's soccer tournament was the postseason women's soccer tournament for the SEC. The Florida Gators were the defending champions, but they were eliminated from the 2017 tournament with a 2–1 overtime loss to the Texas A&M Aggies in the semifinals. Texas A&M won the tournament title with a 2–1 win over the Arkansas Razorbacks in the final. This was the third SEC women's soccer tournament title for Texas A&M, all of which have come under the direction of head coach G Guerrieri.

Qualification 

The top ten teams earned a berth into the SEC Tournament. The tournament is held at Orange Beach Sportsplex in Orange Beach, Alabama. Four of the ten teams in the tournament were ranked in the United Soccer Coaches poll prior to the beginning of the tournament.

Bracket

Schedule 

All matches are played at Orange Beach Sportsplex in Orange Beach, Alabama.

First round

Quarterfinals

Semifinals

Final

Statistics

Goalscorers

All-Tournament team 

MVP in boldSource:

See also 

 Southeastern Conference
 2017 NCAA Division I women's soccer season
 2017 NCAA Division I Women's Soccer Tournament

References

External links 
 2017 SEC Soccer Tournament

2017 NCAA Division I women's soccer season
2017